John Barrie may refer to:

 John Barrie (actor) (1917–1980), English actor
 John Barrie (footballer) (1925–2015), Scottish footballer
 John Barrie (snooker player) (1924–1996), English snooker player

See also
John Barry (disambiguation)